Francesco Sanahuja Ros (23 August 1899 - 22 February 1973) was a Spanish footballer who played as a midfielder for FC Internacional and Espanyol. He also played a few games for the Catalan national team during the 20s, however, due to the little statistical rigor that the newspapers had at that time, the exact amount of caps he earned is unknown. Together with Paulino Alcántara, Josep Samitier and Ricardo Zamora, he was part of the great Catalonia side of the twenties that won the 1923-24 Prince of Asturias Cup, an inter-regional competition organized by the RFEF. It's worth mentioning that some reports list him as one of the eleven footballers who represented Catalonia in the infamous final against a Castile/Madrid XI, helping his side salvage a 4-4 draw, and then being a substitute in the replay as Catalonia won the second Prince of Asturias Cup title in their history.

Honours

International
Catalonia

Prince of Asturias Cup:
Champions (1): 1926

References

1899 births
1973 deaths
Sportspeople from the Province of Castellón
Spanish footballers
Association football midfielders
RCD Espanyol footballers
Catalonia international footballers